The 2013 ASB Classic was a women's tennis tournament played on outdoor hard courts. It was the 28th edition of the ASB Classic, and was part of the WTA International tournaments of the 2013 WTA Tour. It took place at the ASB Tennis Centre in Auckland, New Zealand, from 31 December 2012 to 6 January 2013.

Singles main-draw entrants

Seeds

1 Rankings as of 24 December 2012

Other entrants
The following players received wildcards into the singles main draw:
  Eleni Daniilidou
  CoCo Vandeweghe
  Eugenie Bouchard

The following players received entry from the qualifying draw:
  Stéphanie Dubois
  Nudnida Luangnam
  Grace Min
  Anastasija Sevastova

The following player received entry as lucky loser:
  Gréta Arn

Withdrawals
Before the tournament
  Petra Cetkovská
  Kristina Mladenovic
  Polona Hercog
  Vera Zvonareva (shoulder injury)

Retirements
  Sorana Cîrstea (illness)

Doubles main-draw entrants

Seeds

1 Rankings as of 24 December 2012

Champions

Singles

  Agnieszka Radwańska defeated  Yanina Wickmayer 6–4, 6–4
It was Radwańska's 11th career title, tying her with Ana Ivanovic and Anabel Medina Garrigues for 10th most among active players.

Doubles

  Cara Black /  Anastasia Rodionova defeated  Julia Görges /  Yaroslava Shvedova 2–6, 6–2, [10–5]

See also
 2013 Heineken Open – men's tournament

References

External links
Official website

ASB Classic
WTA Auckland Open
ASB
ASB
ASB
2013 in New Zealand tennis